The Woman Thou Gavest Me is a 1919 silent film directed by Hugh Ford and starring Jack Holt, Katherine MacDonald and Milton Sills. It was produced by Famous Players-Lasky and distributed through Famous Players-Lasky and Paramount Pictures. The film is based on the 1913 controversial novel The Woman Thou Gavest Me by Hall Caine, adapted for the screen by Beulah Marie Dix. A song of the same name with words and music by Al Piantadosi promoted the film.

Cast
Katherine MacDonald - Mary MacNeill
Jack Holt - Lord Raa
Milton Sills - Martin Conrad
Theodore Roberts - Daniel MacNeill
Fritzi Brunette - Alma Lier
Katherine Griffith - Aunt Bridget
Winter Hall - Minister

Plot
Daniel McNeill swears to take revenge on his landlord Lord Raa for the humiliation Raa had inflicted on him during his childhood. Years later, after making his fortune, McNeill buys Raa's castle and marries his young daughter, Mary to the profligate heir to the Raa title. The married couple leave on their honeymoon, but Mary lives with her husband in name only. Raa refuses to give her a divorce because he would lose all claim to the McNeil fortune.

Mary meets Martin Conrad, an old sweetheart  of hers. While Raa entertains an affinity in India, she and Martin find themselves thrown together in Africa. Conrad, an explorer, leaves on an Antarctic voyage. Pregnant, Mary seeks a secluded spot in southern France for the birth, refusing to live with her husband. When Mary's father insists that she return to Lord Raa she tells him the child is Conrad's.

After learning that Conrad had been lost on the expedition a penniless Mary returns to London where she turns to prostitution to make money to care for her child. The first man she approaches is Conrad who has been searching for her.

Status
This film is lost

References

External links

 The Woman Thou Gavest Me at IMDb.com

Piantadosi, Al, "The Woman Thou Gavest Me" (1919). Vocal Popular Sheet Music Collection. Score 2770.

1919 films
American silent feature films
Lost American films
Films directed by Hugh Ford
Paramount Pictures films
Films based on British novels
American black-and-white films
1910s American films